Od zítřka nečaruji is a 1978 Czechoslovak film directed by Jindřich Polák. The film starred Josef Kemr.

References

External links
 

1978 films
Czechoslovak comedy films
1970s Czech-language films
Films directed by Jindřich Polák
Czech comedy films
1970s Czech films